Paper Flowers may refer to:

 Paper Flowers (1959 film), a 1959 Hindi film
 Paper Flowers (1977 film), a 1977 Mexican film
 "Paper Flowers" (song), by Alicia Keys from the album Keys
 Paper Flower (film), 2011 film directed and produced by Brent Ryan Green

See also 
 Paper flower (disambiguation)